State Route 159 (SR 159) is a west to east highway in the U.S. state of Tennessee that is 12 miles (20 km) long. It begins in Carter County at State Route 67 and ends in Johnson County at the North Carolina state line. State Route 159 is little-known by the general public by this designation as it is overlain by U.S. Route 321; the "159" designation is seen on mileposts.

Route description

SR 159, overlain by US 321, traverses  along the banks of Watauga Lake.  It is a curvy two-lane mountain highway.

History
In 2011-12, a bridge replacement project closed a section of the highway at the Elk River; a detour route was signed using both US 321 and SR 159, along SR 67 and US 421 in Tennessee to Vilas, North Carolina, where it ended. This was the only time SR 159 has ever been signed during its entire existence.

Counties traversed (west to east)
State Route 159 traverses the counties shown in the table below.

Junction list

References

Tennessee Department of Transportation (24 January 2003). "State Highway and Interstate List 2003".

External links
 
 Tennessee Department of Transportation

159
Transportation in Carter County, Tennessee
Transportation in Johnson County, Tennessee